Shyam Sundar Baishnab (died 4 December 2000) was a Bangladeshi folk singer. He was awarded Ekushey Padak in 2008 by the Government of Bangladesh for his contribution to music.

Career
Baishnab originated from Chittagong.

References

2000 deaths
Bangladeshi folk singers
20th-century Bangladeshi male singers
20th-century Bangladeshi singers
Recipients of the Ekushey Padak
People from Chittagong
Place of birth missing
Date of birth missing